is a train station on the Osaka Metro Nagahori Tsurumi-ryokuchi Line and the border of 2 wards of Osaka, Japan: Joto-ku and Tsurumi-ku.  The address of the station is 14-15, Imafuku-higashi Nichome, Joto-ku .

Layout
There is an island platform fenced with platform gates between two tracks underground.

Jōtō-ku, Osaka
Osaka Metro stations
Railway stations in Osaka
Railway stations in Japan opened in 1990